Pinky Maidasani is an Indian female folk rapper, playback and peacock singer. She has earned the title of first female folk rapper of India. She has performed in more than 5000 live shows; her songs have been featured in recent Bollywood movies. She sings in 13 languages. She has sung songs in the Bollywood film Luv Shuv Tey Chicken Khurana. She sang a Punjabi rap song "Kikli Kalerdi" accompanied with Yo Yo Honey Singh. In 2015, her film Sharafat Gayi Tel Lene hit the theatres. She combined the rap with desi music.

Early life
She was born in a Sindhi family. Her father was employed in the railways, because of which she stayed in remote locations of northern and central India in her childhood. She is the youngest of five siblings. Her family supported her to pursue a career in singing.

Career
In her childhood, she started music classes called Katni from the late Ustad Hibzul Kabir Khan Sahib in Madhya Pradesh. In Katni used to sing bhajans sometime in Madhav Shah darbar. Pinky started as a contesting artist in reality show “Indian Idol 3”,  and sang songs for Bollywood movies.

Filmography
As a playback singer she has performed in following Bollywood movies.

Brahmachari Directed by Chandra Mohan
Sharafat Gayi Tel Lene Directed by Gurmmeet Singh
Luv Shuv Tey Chicken Khurana
Chann Pardesi
Mr Joe B. Carvalho
Sharma Ji Ki Lag Gayi

Singles
Bullet Wale Saiyaan 
Chumma Chaati
Aya Ladiya
Kikli Kalerdi
Dilli ki Sarkar
Turn it up
Dekh Le Kismat Yaar
Tera Rang
Rang Dangi Teri Choli
Tere Ishq Mein Fanna
Holi Ke Bahane Rishta Jod Jaad Le
Sindh
Saiyaan Ji

References

External links
Bullet Wale Saiyaan
Pinky Maidasani on SoundCloud

Living people
Sindhi playback singers
Indian people of Sindhi descent
Year of birth missing (living people)